The H. D. Champlin & Son Horseshoeing and Wagonmaking shop building is located on Main Street (NY 301) in Nelsonville, New York, United States. It is a typical commercial structure for a common business of the late 19th century that survives in good condition. In 1982 it was added to the National Register of Historic Places.

Champlin started his business in 1858 in a building on nearby Spring Street behind the present property. His name does not show up on maps at that site until 1876, and only by 1912 does the current, one-story brick building appear on any map of the village.

The entranceway was expanded and a larger door installed at some point before then. It is used today as a garage.

References

Commercial buildings on the National Register of Historic Places in New York (state)
Buildings and structures in Putnam County, New York
National Register of Historic Places in Putnam County, New York